M. D. Ramasami was an Indian politician and former Member of the Legislative Assembly of Tamil Nadu. He was elected to the Tamil Nadu legislative assembly as an Independent candidate from Aruppukottai constituency in 1957 election.

Ramasami resigned his Lok Sabha seat on the afternoon of 25 March 1957.

References 

Tamil Nadu politicians